Conejos Peak is a high and prominent mountain summit in the southern San Juan Mountains of the Rocky Mountains of North America. The summit of Conejos Peak is the highest point in Conejos County.

See also

List of mountain peaks of Colorado
List of Colorado county high points

References

San Juan Mountains (Colorado)
Mountains of Conejos County, Colorado
Rio Grande National Forest
North American 4000 m summits
Mountains of Colorado